Jane's Addiction is the live album by Jane's Addiction, released on May 15, 1987. Its basic tracks were recorded live at the Roxy Theatre in Los Angeles on January 26, 1987, with additional overdubs and corrections recorded at The Edge Studio in Los Angeles. An audience applause dub from a Los Lobos concert was overlaid onto the final mix.

Music
The basic tracks were recorded live over a single night in Los Angeles, with additional in-studio recording and overdubs done later. Several songs would be rerecorded for other releases. Of the band-written songs, only "Trip Away," "1%," "I Would For You," and "My Time" have not been rerecorded and rereleased. (A demo of "I Would For You" was released on the 1991 compilation Live and Rare; however, this was recorded in 1986, predating the Jane's Addiction album.)

Of the original recording, Perry Farrell recalled: "There was a lot of heat in that room. Heat from brains and bodies that were fully charged up. I knew it was important to speak to the artisans, but I really felt I was addressing the powers that be, too."

"Jane Says" and "Pigs in Zen" were rerecorded for Nothing's Shocking, the band's major label debut. "Whores" and "Chip Away" were rerecorded in 2009 by the reunited Jane's Addiction for the NINJA EP, a collaboration with Nine Inch Nails to promote the joint NINJA tour.

The album included two covers: "Rock & Roll" by The Velvet Underground, and "Sympathy for the Devil" by The Rolling Stones, the latter retitled "Sympathy".

At least one other song, "Slow Divers," was recorded for the album but left off for unknown reasons. "Slow Divers" would eventually be released ten years later on the band's 1997 outtake/alternate/live/new compilation Kettle Whistle.

No singles were released from Jane's Addiction.

Reception
"Here is proof that Jane's Addiction surpassed puberty before they came of age," wrote Nick Griffiths in a review of a CD reissue for Select. "Jane's Addiction is sex, obsession, tortured-soul food – a rape of the senses. It's no Immaculate Conception, but it's immaculate."

Packaging
Jane's Addiction has a large number of packaging variations. There are at least four distinct variations of the CD artwork, and seven variations of the vinyl.

The variations all deal with actual disc color and art; the album cover and liner notes remain consistent across all variations in most cases. The very first CD pressing of the album, which is just a standard silver disc with track names and other info in black typeface, contains a typo in the track list on the disc itself; "Pigs in Zen" is listed as "Pigs in Ten." This typo was corrected on all subsequent pressings.

Later versions of the CD album include a blue colored disc with rounded, stylized text for the track list as well as a version that has the actual cover artwork silkscreened on the disc itself.

Track listing

Personnel
Jane's Addiction
Perry Farrell – vocals
Dave Navarro – guitar
Eric Avery – bass
Stephen Perkins – drums

Production
Mark Linett – production
Patrick von Wiegandt – recording engineer
Eddy Schreyer – recording engineer

Design
Karyn Cantor – photography 
Perry Farrell – artwork

References

Jane's Addiction albums
1987 live albums
Triple X Records live albums
Albums produced by Mark Linett
Albums recorded at the Roxy Theatre